Agios Panteleimonas Greek Orthodox Church is a Greek Orthodox church dedicated to Saint Pantaleon located in Kuzguncuk neighborhood of Üsküdar district in Istanbul, Turkey.

History
The church was opened to worship during the reign of Ottoman Sultan Mahmud II in 1831. In 1872, the church building had a fire. Designed by architect Nikola Ziko, a new construction began in 1890. Two years later, the church reopened to service.

Architecture
The church building is designed in Greek cross form of Byzantine architecture. The dome covering the central part of the building is carried by four pillars. The belfry, built by Andon Hüdaverdioğlu of Kuzguncuk in 1911, is situated over the marble courtyard entrance gate. Just on the street beside the church, a small square-plan holy well (pr. hagiasma) is situated.

See also
 Agios Georgios Greek Orthodox Church, Kuzguncuk

References

Greek Orthodox churches in Istanbul
Churches completed in 1892
1892 establishments in the Ottoman Empire
Üsküdar
Bosphorus
19th-century churches in Turkey